Live at the De De De Der is the name of two live albums by English musician Damon Albarn, recorded by Abbey Road Studios during his two consecutive dates at the Royal Albert Hall in London on the 15 and 16 November 2014, available for sale immediately after each show. The performances feature Albarn's band The Heavy Seas, and include guest appearances by artists such as Brian Eno, De La Soul, Kano, and Albarn's Blur bandmate Graham Coxon. The albums feature songs from a number of Albarn's projects, including songs by Gorillaz, Blur, The Good, the Bad & the Queen, and Mali Music. The albums were released exclusively for sale at the two performances and on the Abbey Road Studios website. Damon Albarn's long-term partner Suzi Winstanley designed the front cover.

Track listing
Track listing and guest appearances are identical for both performances. Song lengths listed are according to the November 16 performance.

Personnel
The Heavy Seas
Damon Albarn - lead vocals, guitars, melodica, piano
Mike Smith - piano, keyboards, backing vocals
Jeff Wootton -  lead guitar, six string bass, backing vocals
Seye Adelekan - bass guitar, ukulele, rhythm guitar, backing vocals
Pauli Stanley-McKenzie - drums, percussion, backing vocals

The Heavy Seas Choir
Angel Williams-Silvera
Teni Abosende
Cherrelle Rose
Tsega Tabege
Geo Gabriel
Lawrence Rowe

Demon Strings
Izzi Dunn
Antonia Pagulatos
Kotono Sato
Stella Page

Guest artists
De La Soul
Graham Coxon
Kano
Afel Bocoum
Madou Sidiki Diabaté
Richard Russell
Brian Eno
Kaktus Einarsson
The Leytonstone City Mission Choir

References

Damon Albarn albums
2014 live albums
Parlophone live albums